Gianluca "Luca" Cuomo (born April 2, 1993) is an American soccer player.

References 

 USL League One bio

Living people
1993 births
Association football defenders
American soccer players
San Antonio FC players
Mosta F.C. players
Soccer players from New York (state)
Sportspeople from Rochester, New York
National Independent Soccer Association players
USL Championship players
Philadelphia Fury players
American expatriate soccer players
Expatriate footballers in Malta
American expatriates in Malta